Mittie Morris (1874-1953) was a social reformer, known as "Mother Morris". She was the founder of the Faith Home Mission.

She died in 1953 and was buried at the Valhalla Memorial Park Cemetery, North Hollywood,
Los Angeles County, California.

References

1874 births
1953 deaths
Date of birth missing
Date of death missing
Place of birth missing
Place of death missing